Parker Ridge is a Canadian community in the rural community of Upper Miramichi in York County, New Brunswick. on Route 625.

History

Notable people

See also
List of communities in New Brunswick

References

Settlements in New Brunswick
Communities in York County, New Brunswick